Ruth Zukerman is co-founder of indoor cycling businesses SoulCycle and Flywheel Sports.

Early life
Zukerman grew up in Roslyn, New York to a family of Polish, Russian, and German-Jewish heritage. Her father was a physician and her mother a psychotherapist. She was a cheerleader and dancer in school, and majored in dance at Mount Holyoke College.  After a few years trying to find dance work in New York City, she decided to give it up.

In the early 1980s, she was offered a job teaching aerobics on the Upper West Side of Manhattan. Years later, after a divorce in 1996, she was introduced to spin classes. She was drawn to physical and mental aspects of the exercise, which she credits in helping her through the time of the divorce. When her instructor moved away she took up teaching at the Reebok gym, where she worked for five years.

SoulCycle
While teaching at Zonehampton, Elizabeth Cutler met Zukerman and followed her to Reebok to propose opening a boutique spin studio based on her method of teaching, asking her to be the face of the business.  Julie Rice, also one of her riders and a friend, became the third co-founder upon Zukerman's suggestion. SoulCycle opened its first studio in 2006 on Manhattan's Upper West Side.

Flywheel Sports
In 2009, Zukerman left SoulCycle to start Flywheel Sports with Jay Galuzzo and David Seldin. Flywheel opened in 2010. The companies are now competitors, with different marketing strategies, styles, and use of technology.

In December 2018, Zukerman left Flywheel Sports.

References

Living people
American Jews
People from Roslyn, New York
Exercise instructors
Creative directors
American women in business
Year of birth missing (living people)
Mount Holyoke College alumni
21st-century American women